is a Japanese actress and former member of the Japanese idol girl group AKB48, where she was the captain of Team B.

Biography 

On November 13, 2009, Kizaki passed SKE48's third-generation auditions. On June 23, 2010, she got promoted to an official member belonging to Team S. Gomen ne, Summer was the single where Kizaki was selected to sing the title track for the first time.

In the 2012 general elections, Kizaki placed 31st. In the 2013 general elections, her rank improved and she placed 22nd.

During AKB48's group shuffle on February 24, 2014, it was announced Kizaki would transfer to AKB48, Team 4. She debuted with AKB48 on April 24, 2014.

On April 12, 2017, Kizaki announced her graduation on AKB48 radio show All Night Nippon. She had her last handshake event on August 13, 2017, had her SKE48 graduation ceremony on September 28, 2017 and graduated from AKB48's Team B on September 30, 2017.

On October 23, 2021, Tristone Entertainment announced that Kizaki will go on hiatus from the entertainment industry due to physical and mental health issues.

Discography

AKB48

AKB48 Albums
 Koko ni Ita koto
 Koko ni Ita koto
 1830m
 Itsuka Mita Umi no Soko
 Yasashisa no Chizu
 Aozora yo Sabishikunai ka?
 Tsugi no Ashiato
 Boy Hunt no Houhou Oshiemasu
 Ponkotsu Blues
 Koko ga Rhodes da, Koko de Tobe!
 Koko ga Rhodes da, Koko de Tobe!
 Namida wa ato Mawashi

SKE48

SKE48 Albums 
 Kono Hi no Chime o Wasurenai
 Hula Hoop de Go! Go! Go!
 Sunenagara, Ame...
 Beginner

Appearances

Stage units

AKB48
Team 4 3rd Stage

SKE48
SKE48 Kenkyuusei Stage 
 
 
Team S 3rd Stage 
 
 
Team S 4th Stage "Reset"

Variety 
  (2009–2012)
 Shuukan AKB (2010–2012)
 AKBingo! (2010–2017)
 SKE48 Gakuen (2010–2014)
  (2010–2016)
 Shitte Kaiketsu! SKE48 to Net (2010)
 SKE48 no Idol x Idol (2010)
 Star Hime Sagashi Tarou (2011)
 Itte♡Koi 48 (2011)
 Bananaman no Blog Deka (2011)
 SKE48 Musume ni Ikaga!? (2011)
 SKE48 no Sekai Seifuku Joshi (2011)
 SKE48 no Magical Radio (2011)
 SKE48 no Magical Radio 2 (2012)
 SKE48 no Magical Radio 3 (2013)
 Renai Sousenkyo (2014)

Dramas 
 Strike Love (2010)
 Mousou Deka (2011)
 Asu no Hikari wo Tsukame 2 (2011)
 Majisuka Gakuen 3 (2012) – Peace
 Gyarubasara Gaiden (2012)
 GTO (2014)
 Majisuka Gakuen 4 (2015) – Magic
 Majisuka Gakuen 5 (2015) – Magic
 AKB Horror Night: Adrenaline's Night Ep.1 – Scissors (2015) – Kazumi
 AKB Love Night: Love Fatory Ep.27 – Sudden Kiss (2016), Harumi
 Cabasuka Gakuen (2016–2017) – Magic (Gari)
 Tofu Pro-Wrestling (2017) – Yuria Kizaki/Papparā Kizaki
 Ossan's Love: In the Sky (2019) – Tamiyo Arisugawa

Movies 
  (2011)
  (2014)
 Shimajirō to Ehon no Kuni ni (2016) Kicky (voice) 
 (2018)

Photobooks 
 Peace (2015)
 Stagedoor (2017)

Notes
Her surname, Kizaki, uses the kanji 﨑 instead of 崎. Because of this, magazine publishers and fans misspelled her name as 木崎. The Japanese Wikipedia also uses the incorrect kanji due to the limitations of the JIS X 0208 standard.

References

External links 
 AKB48 Official Profile 
 Twitter 
 Google+ 

1996 births
Living people
Japanese idols
AKB48 members
Japanese women pop singers
Musicians from Aichi Prefecture
21st-century Japanese women singers
21st-century Japanese singers
21st-century Japanese actresses